Agricultural Station ( – Īstgāh-e Keshāvarzī) is a village and agricultural station in Marhemetabad Rural District, in the Central District of Miandoab County, West Azerbaijan Province, Iran. At the 2006 census, its population was 21, in 7 families.

References 

Populated places in Miandoab County